The Piatra (also: Pârâul Pietrei) is a left tributary of the river Mureș in Transylvania, Romania. It discharges into the Mureș in Remetea. Its name means "Stone Creek" in both languages.

References

Rivers of Romania
Rivers of Harghita County